Bartolo Ceru (active Venice, died circa 1660)  was an Italian painter, mainly of quadratura. He trained under Maffeo Verona. Some of his paintings were engraved and tinted in aquaforte by Marco Boschini.

References

Year of birth missing
Year of death missing
17th-century Italian painters
Italian male painters
Painters from Venice
Quadratura painters